The Tatanagar - Jammu Tawi Express / Muri Express is an Express train belonging to Indian Railways – South Eastern Railway zone that runs between  &  in India.

It operates as train number 18101 from Tatanagar Junction to Jammu Tawi and as train number 18102 in the reverse direction, serving the states of Jharkhand, Uttar Pradesh, Delhi, Haryana, Punjab and Jammu and Kashmir.

Coaches

The 18101 / 02 Tatanagar–Jammu Tawi has 2 AC 2 Tier,  7 AC 3 tier, 7 Sleeper Class, 2 Unreserved/General & 2 Seating cum Luggage Rake Coaches. It also carry a pantry car.

Service

As the average speed of the train is below , as per Indian Railways rules, its fare does not include a Superfast surcharge.

Routeing

Traction

As the entire route is now fully electrified, a Tatanagar-based WAP-7 locomotive which hauls the train from Tatanagar up to Amritsar and handing over to a Ghaziabad-based WAP-7 locomotive which powers the train until Jammu Tawi & vice versa.

Operation

18101 Tatanagar–Jammu Tawi Express runs from Tatanagar Junction on Sunday, Wednesday & Friday reaching Jammu Tawi on the 3rd day.
18102 Jammu Tawi–Tatanagar Junction Express runs from Jammu Tawi on Monday, Wednesday & Saturday reaching Tatanagar Junction on the 3rd day.

2015 derailment 

On 25 May 2015, 8 coaches of –Jammu Tawi Muri Express derailed near Athsari, on Mughalsarai–Kanpur section around 1:40 pm in afternoon. 4 people died and 9 were injured in the accident. Both, Rail Minister Suresh Prabhu & Chief Minister of U.P. Akhilesh Yadav announced compensation to the victims of accident.

References

External links

Named passenger trains of India
Rail transport in Jharkhand
Rail transport in Uttar Pradesh
Rail transport in Delhi
Rail transport in Haryana
Rail transport in Punjab, India
Rail transport in Jammu and Kashmir
Transport in Jammu
Transport in Jamshedpur
Express trains in India